Eugène Neefs was a Belgian football player who competed in the 1900 Olympic Games. In Paris he won a bronze medal as a member of Université de Bruxelles club team.

Professionally, Neefs was a military veterinarian.

References

External links

Belgian footballers
Olympic bronze medalists for Belgium
Olympic footballers of Belgium
Footballers at the 1900 Summer Olympics
Year of birth missing
Year of death missing
Olympic medalists in football
Association football midfielders
Medalists at the 1900 Summer Olympics
Place of birth missing
Place of death missing